Shades of Green may refer to:
 Shades of green, an article about shades of the colour green
 Shades of Green (resort), a United States Department of Defense-owned resort at Walt Disney World
Shades of Green (album), by jazz guitarist Grant Green
 50 Shades of Green, an album by Tracy T
Reed Green, American football coach

See also
:Category:Shades of green
 Shades of Greene, a 1975 British television series based on short stories by Graham Greene